Kyanika is a settlement in Kisoro District in the Western Region of Uganda.

Location
Kyanika is in Kisoro District, Kigezi sub-region. The town sits adjacent to Cyanika, across Uganda's international border with Rwanda.

The coordinates of Kyanika, Uganda are 1°20'20.0"S, 29°44'20.0"E (Latitude:-1.338889; Longitude:29.738889).

Overview
Immediately south of Kyanika, across the Rwandan border, is the town of Cyanika. The Kyanika/Cyanika border crossing is an important transit point between the two countries. The other two major road crossings are Katuna/Gatuna and Mirama Hills/Kagitumba.

Points of interest
The following additional points of interest lie within the town limits or close to the edges of the town: (a) the offices of Kyanika Town Council (b) Kyanika central market (c) Kabale–Kisoro–Bunagana Road: The  southern extension of this road, from Kisoro to Kyanika, ends here.

See also
Uganda Revenue Authority
List of cities and towns in Uganda
List of roads in Uganda

References

External links
 Uganda, Rwanda Start 24-Hour Border Services

Populated places in Western Region, Uganda
Kisoro District
Rwanda–Uganda border crossings